The 2009 Intersport Heilbronn Open was a professional tennis tournament played on indoor hard courts. It was part of the Tretorn SERIE+ of the 2009 ATP Challenger Tour. It took place in Talheim, Germany between 26 January and 1 February 2009.

Singles main-draw entrants

Seeds

 Rankings are as of January 19, 2009.

Other entrants
The following players received wildcards into the singles main draw:
  Dieter Kindlmann
  Nils Langer
  Florian Mayer
  Cedrik-Marcel Stebe

The following players received entry from the qualifying draw:
  Matthias Bachinger
  Benedikt Dorsch
  Andis Juška
  Laurent Recouderc

The following player received the lucky loser spot:
  Alejandro Falla

Champions

Men's singles

 Benjamin Becker def.  Karol Beck, 6–4, 6–4

Men's doubles

 Karol Beck /  Jaroslav Levinský def.  Benedikt Dorsch /  Philipp Petzschner, 6–3, 6–2

External links

Intersport Heilbronn Open
2009 in German tennis
Intersport Heilbronn Open
2000s in Baden-Württemberg